Jukhtak Vank is an 11th– or 12th-century monastery situated in a clearing within Dilijan National Park, 3.2 km northwest from the town of Dilijan in the Tavush Province of Armenia.  It sits in close proximity to the church of Matosavank as well as a cemetery that surrounds the church.

Architecture 
The larger church of Surb Grigor has a small cruciform central-plan, with one portal and had a single dome and drum that collapsed long ago.  Exterior walls still stand intact, yet metal reinforcements currently surround the structure to keep its walls from collapsing (likely put into place during 1973-77 when some reconstruction efforts took place).  S. Grigor is likely to have been built in the 11th or 12th century. 

The smaller church of Surb Astvatsatsin sits near S. Grigor to the west and has the following inscription written upon it:

Gallery

References

Bibliography

External links 
 Armeniapedia: Jukhtak Monastery
 Armenian Travel Bureau: Jukhtak Monastery

Christian monasteries in Armenia
Tourist attractions in Tavush Province
Buildings and structures in Tavush Province